G-protein coupled receptor 139 (GPC139) is a protein that in humans is encoded by the GPR139 gene. Recent research ('21) has shown that mice with loss of GCP139 experience schizophrenia-like symptomatology that is rescued with the dopamine receptor antagonist haloperidol and the μ-opioid receptor antagonist naltrexone; as well, the recently developed, potent, and GPR139 receptor selective agonist TAK-041 (aka NBI-1065846) is currently undergoing trials to gauge the efficacy for treating psychiatric conditions such as major depressive disorder and the negative symptoms of schizophrenia.

References

Further reading 

 
 
 
 
 

G protein-coupled receptors